The Oath of Stephan Huller is a 1921 German silent drama film directed by Reinhard Bruck and starring Anton Edthofer, Hanni Weisse and Alexander Areuss. It is based on the 1912 novel of the same title by Felix Hollaender.

The film's sets were designed by the art director Siegfried Wroblewsky.

Cast
 Anton Edthofer as Friedrich Huller
 Hanni Weisse as Frau Huller
 Alexander Areuss as Sohn Stephan Huller
 Arthur Bergen as Verführer
 Carl de Vogt
 Hugo Döblin as Agent
 Max Pohl as Geschworener

References

Bibliography
 Bock, Hans-Michael & Bergfelder, Tim. The Concise CineGraph. Encyclopedia of German Cinema. Berghahn Books, 2009.

External links

1921 films
Films of the Weimar Republic
German silent feature films
Films directed by Reinhard Bruck
German black-and-white films
Circus films
Remakes of German films
1920s German films